The Parok is a river in Perm Krai and Komi Republic, Russia, a right tributary of the Parmanka, which in turn is a tributary of the Chyornaya.

References 

Rivers of Perm Krai
Rivers of the Komi Republic